Ephraim Moses Lilien (23 May 1874 – 18 July 1925) was an art nouveau illustrator and printmaker particularly noted for his art on Jewish themes. He is sometimes called the "first Zionist artist."

Biography
Ephraim Moses Lilien (Maurycy Lilien) was born in 1874, in Drohobycz, Galicia, then in the Austro-Hungarian Empire. In 1889-1893, Lilien learned painting and graphic techniques at the Academy of Arts in Kraków. He studied under Polish painter Jan Matejko from 1890 to 1892.

As a member of the Zionist Movement, Lilien traveled to Ottoman Palestine several times between 1906 and 1918.

Lilien attended the Fifth Zionist Congress, held in Basel, as a member of the Democratic Fraction, an opposition group that supported the development of secular national culture. In 1905, at the Seventh Zionist Congress, in Basel, he, along with Boris Schatz, became a member of a committee formed to help establish the Bezalel Art School. As part of that work he accompanied Schatz to Jerusalem.

Art career
Lilien was one of the two artists to accompany Boris Schatz to what is now Israel in 1906 for the purpose of establishing Bezalel Academy of Arts and Design, and taught the school's first class in 1906. Although his stay in the country was short-lived, he left his indelible stamp on the creation of an Eretz Israel style, placing biblical subjects in the Zionist context and oriental settings, conceived in an idealized Western design. In the first two decades of the century, Lilien's work served as a model for the Bezalel group.

Lilien is known for his famous photographic portrait of Theodor Herzl. He often used Herzl as a model, considering his features a perfect representation of the "New Jew." In 1896, he received an award for photography from the avantgarde magazine Jugend. Lilien illustrated several books. In 1923, an exhibition of his work opened in New York.

Lilien's illustrated books include Juda (1900), Biblically themed poetry by Lilien's Christian friend, Börries Freiherr von Münchhausen, and Lieder des Ghetto (Songs of the Ghetto) (1903), Yiddish poems by Morris Rosenfeld translated into German.

Lilien died in Badenweiler, Germany in 1925. A street in the Nayot neighborhood of Jerusalem is named for him.

Gallery

References

External links 

 
 
 .
 Illustrations in "Lieder des Ghetto".
 Ephraim Moses Lilien Collection at the Leo Baeck Institute, New York.

1874 births
1925 deaths
Art Nouveau illustrators
Jewish artists
Austrian photographers
Austrian illustrators
Polish photographers
Polish illustrators
Zionist activists
Israeli illustrators
Israeli photographers
Academy of Fine Arts Vienna alumni
Austrian emigrants to Israel
People from Drohobych
Austro-Hungarian Jews
Jews from Galicia (Eastern Europe)
People from the Kingdom of Galicia and Lodomeria
Early photographers in Palestine